In the AFL Women's (AFLW), the Carlton best and fairest award is awarded to the best and fairest player at the Carlton Football Club during the home-and-away season. The award has been awarded annually since the competition's inaugural season in 2017, and Brianna Davey was the inaugural winner of the award.

Recipients

See also

 John Nicholls Medal (list of Carlton Football Club best and fairest winners in the Australian Football League)

References

AFL Women's awards
Lists of AFL Women's players
 
Awards established in 2017